Otto Martin Pfister (born 24 November 1937) is a German football manager and one of Germany's most successful coaching exports, voted Africa's Manager of the Year in 1992. He is formerly the manager of the Afghanistan national team.

Coaching career
Pfister has been involved in association football for almost 60 years, he began his coaching career in Switzerland as player-coach in 1961 at the age of just 23. Pfister's early coaching experience was gained with FC Vaduz, FC St. Gallen, FC Nordstern Basel, FC Moutier and finally FC Chur 97. He has worked as head coach for 10 international football teams, eight from Africa and two from Asia. In June 1972, at the age of 34, Pfister retired from his playing days and left Switzerland for Africa, taking the reins as the head coach of Rwanda. Pfister would stay in Africa for 23 years until 1995 working as the head coach for five other African Nations. Upper Volta (now Burkina Faso), Senegal, Ivory Coast, Zaire (now DR Congo) and Ghana. Among his achievements include winning the JVC Fifa U17 Junior World Cup with Ghana in Italy and getting the Ghana Soccer national team to the finals of the 1992 African cup of nations in Senegal. In 1995, Pfister worked inside the Asian Football Confederation (AFC) as the head coach of Bangladesh National Team and also Saudi Arabia from 1997 - 1999. Pfister returned to club football over the following six years with Egyptian team Zamalek, Tunisian club CS Sfaxien, Lebanese club Nejmeh and Egyptian club Al-Masry. Pfister was selected as the head coach of Togo on 18 February 2006, after former coach Stephen Keshi was dismissed from the post despite having secured qualification for their first World Cup Finals. Pfister himself resigned shortly before the team's first match in the tournament, after his players went on strike against the federation over a pay dispute, but he was reappointed three days later after demands from the players. Pfister was appointed manager of Sudanese club Al-Merreikh on 8 September 2006 and would later leave this position on 26 October 2007. The following day Pfister would sign a contract as the head coach of Cameroon taking him through until 2010.
As of 24 March 2011 Pfister was unveiled as head coach of Trinidad and Tobago. In February 2014, at the age of 76, he made a return to the head coach of Al-Merreikh, a team he had previously guided to the final of the 2007 CAF Confederation Cup.

Burkina Faso
Between 1976 and 1978, Pfister changed the face of football in Burkina Faso. They were known as the Upper Volta national football team until 1984, when Upper Volta became Burkina Faso. The establishment in Burkina Faso welcomed the German coach and because of the natural interest in football, the Government’s commitment and Pfister's ability, the Burkina Faso national team qualified for their first ever African Cup of Nations in 1978 in Ghana. It was the success with the Burkina team that opened the way for Pfister to traverse Africa, the Middle East, and Asia over the following years since his first landing in Africa.

Ivory Coast
In 1982, Pfister became coach of the Ivory Coast national team. He repaid his new employers’ confidence in him by taking the country’s youth team to the 1983 FIFA World Youth Championship in Mexico. They would not qualify to the quarter-finals, however, Pfister would win the U19 African Cup of Nations with Ivory Coast in 1983.

Zaire
Pfister took over as head coach of Congo DR national football team (formerly the Zaire national football team) in 1985, where he would spend four years helping to restore the 1974 African champions to their former glories. Pfister was responsible for unleashing a new generation of ‘Leopards’, including Eugene Kabongo, Gaston Mobati, Panguy Merikani and Mutumbile Santos, all of whom took part in the African Cup of Nations 1988.

Ghana
Pfister led Ghana to a famous win in the 1991 FIFA U-17 World Championship. The Championship was held in the cities of Florence, Montecatini Terme, Viareggio, Massa, Carrara, and Livorno in Italy between 16 and 31 August 1991. Ghana finished second to Spain in their group and progressed to the Quarter-finals where they beat Brazil 2–1 with goals from Mohammed Gargo and Nii Lamptey. After a 0–0 draw with Qatar in the Semi-finals, Ghana won 4–2 in a penalty shoot-out, lining up a final against Spain. On 31 August 1991, Ghana beat Spain 1–0 in the World Cup final in Florence, Ghana's first title.

The Ghana national team qualified for the 1992 African Cup of Nations after finishing top of their qualifying group. Ghana qualified to the Quarter-finals after two 1–0 victories over Egypt and Zambia in the first round of the final tournament. Ghana beat Congo to take them through to the Semi-finals where they beat Nigeria, 2–1. On 26 January 1992 in Senegal, Ghana played Ivory Coast in the final of the African Cup of Nations. After extra time the final score was 0–0 and the game entered penalties. After a marathon penalty shootout, Ivory Coast finally won 11–10 on penalties. The penalty shootout was significant in that it was the first in the final of a major international tournament that every player on the pitch took a penalty.

During Pfister's time with Ghana, he was observed numerous times not wearing a belt, and thus consequently, he wore his trousers very low. This gave rise to the term "Otto Pfister" within Ghanaian popular slang culture. "Otto Pfister" in this regard has come to mean someone sagging their trousers in Ghanaian youth fashion.

Saudi Arabia
Pfister became the head coach of Saudi Arabia in 1997 after previously working in the AFC from 1995–1997 with Bangladesh. In 1997, Pfister successfully guided Saudi Arabia to the 1998 FIFA World Cup in France but was crudely released just before the tournament because he requested the Saudi Princes to interfere less in team affairs. After Saudi Arabia lost their opening two games and failed to progress, Carlos Alberto Parreira was fired and Pfister was reinstated as head coach on completion of the tournament. As World Cup Qualifiers, Saudi Arabia automatically qualified for the 1998 Arab Nations Cup. With the help of an impressive 8 goals in 4 games from Obeid Al-Dosari, Saudi Arabia were crowned champions after beating Qatar 3–1 in the final. Despite being the only team not to lose a game, Saudi Arabia also finished as runners-up in the 1998 Gulf Cup of Nations in Bahrain.

Zamalek
Pfister was highly successful during his time at Zamalek SC. During his time as head coach (1999–2002) Pfister won an impressive five trophies. On 10 December 2000, Zamalek recorded a convincing 4–3 aggregate score in the second-leg final against Canon Yaoundé in the African Cup Winners' Cup (now the Confederations Cup). The first time for the Egyptian team. Pfister led Zamalek for their worst defeat against rivals Al Ahly 6–1 on 16 May 2002, Zamalek also reached the final of the CAF Super Cup, losing 2–0 to Accra Hearts of Oak SC.

Nejmeh
Pfister was appointed as Manager of Nejmeh SC in the Lebanon for the 2004-05 season. After 19 games, Nejmeh were joint top of the 2004–05 Lebanese Premier League with Al-Ansar Club. Both teams needed to win the final match, which incidentally was against each other. The final result was 2–2 and Pfister's Nejmeh were crowned champions as they had a highly superior goal difference. Pfister secured qualification to the 2005 AFC Cup for Nejmeh (which they would eventually finish as runners-up). Pfister also won the Lebanese Super Cup and Lebanese Elite Cup with Nejmeh during the 2004–05 season.

Togo
Pfister was selected to lead the Togo national team three months before World Cup 2006 after Stephen Keshi was sacked. Prior to the World Cup, players went on strike because of unpaid bonuses. Faced with the rebellion over bonuses, Pfister walked out, saying he could take no more. Pfister was reinstated three days later after demands from players and FTF staff.

Sports commentators such as Ed Kavalee ensured that this dispute was resolved with a high level of transparency, with countries as far away as Australia receiving constant Pfister updates.

Togo lost their opening game of the World Cup, despite having taken the lead against South Korea through a goal by Mohamed Kader. In the second half, Jean-Paul Abalo was sent off after 55 minutes, and goals from Lee Chun-Soo and Ahn Jung-Hwan sealed a 2–1 defeat for Togo. Togo's next opponents in Group G were Switzerland, with the match scheduled for the afternoon of 19 June. However, the Togo squad threatened to refuse to fulfil the fixture and take strike action against unpaid bonuses. FIFA negotiated with the squad on 17 June, persuading them to travel to Dortmund in time to fulfil the fixture; goals from Alexander Frei and Tranquillo Barnetta resulted in a 2–0 defeat. Togo's final group game against France ended in 2–0 defeat.

Cameroon
On 27 October 2007, Pfister was appointed the manager of Cameroon, succeeding 80 other candidates.  He coached Cameroon in the 2008 African Cup of Nations, held in Ghana. Two second half goals from Samuel Eto'o were not enough to win their opening game which finished 4–2 to Egypt. Cameroon picked themselves up four days later and beat Zambia convincingly 5–1. In their final group game Eto'o again scored twice as Les Lions Indomptables won 3–0. After finishing second to Egypt in the group stages, Cameroon progressed to the Quarter-finals where, after a close encounter, they beat Tunisia 3–2. Stéphane Mbia scored early in extra time to take the Indomptable Lions through to the Semi-finals. Alain N'Kong scored a 72nd-minute winner for Cameroon in a 1–0 win over Ghana in the Semi-finals, taking Cameroon to their sixth final of the African Cup of Nations. On 10 February 2008, Cameroon took on defending champions Egypt in the Final in Accra. Egypt scored a 77th-minute goal through Mohamed Aboutrika which would be enough to win the match and be crowned the champions of the 2008 African Cup of Nations. Eto'o was the tournaments highest scorer with five goals. Pfister stepped down from his role on 26 May 2009.

USM Alger
In January 2015, Pfister was linked with Algerian Ligue Professionnelle 1 club USM Alger, and signed a contract with the club shortly after. On 18 May Pfister was sacked as coach of USM Alger.

Personal life
Pfister gained his coaching certificates in Magglingen in the 1960s, and later studied further in Cologne. Pfister is a UEFA Pro License holder, has a Bundesliga license for professional football coaching and is an Instructor for FIFA and German Football Association professional football coaching courses.

In 2001, Pfister was awarded the Order of Merit of the Confederation of African Football as well as a German Football Federation Honors Award.

In Ghana the slang "Rules with an Iron-Pfister" is often used to refer to his coaching style.

During his time in Ghana, Pfister's fame transcended football. His unconventional style of wearing his trousers on the hip, rather than the waist, has become a fashion trend among the youth.

Commenting that Tony Yeboah's birthday can not be determined exactly, Ghana's then-manager Otto Pfister said: There's only one way to find out: saw his leg off and count the rings!

Honours
 African Cup of Nations: Finalist with Cameroon in 2008
 Al-Merrikh Sudanese Cup Winner 2007, Finalist of CAF Confederation Cup 2007
 World Cup: Appearances: 2006 with Togo
 Nejmeh SC: Lebanese Premier League 2004–05 Champion 2005, Lebanese Elite Cup Champion 2004, 2005 AFC Cup Qualification 2005, Lebanese Super Cup Champion 2004
  CS Sfaxien: Tunisian League Cup Champion 2003, Arab Champions League Qualification 2003
  Al-Zamalek: League Cup Champion 2002, African Champions League Qualification 2002, FIFA Club World Championship Qualification 2002, African Cup Winners' Cup 2000, Egyptian League Champion 2001–2002, Egypt Cup Champion 2001–2002, CAF Super Cup final 2001–2002
 World Cup: Qualification with Saudi Arabia in 1998, Arab Nations Cup Winner in 1998, Finalist at the 1998 Gulf Cup of Nations in Bahrain. FIFA Confederations Cup Appearances: 1997,
 4-nation Tiger Trophy : Champion 1995 with Bangladesh
 African Cup of Nations: Finalist: 1992 with Ghana
 Africa's Manager of the Year in 1992
 FIFA U-17 World Championship: Champion 1991 with Ghana
 African Cup of Nations: Appearances: Zaire 1988
 U-19 African Cup of Nations: 1983 Champion with Ivory Coast
 African Cup of Nations: Appearances: Upper Volta (now: Burkina Faso) 1978

Managerial statistics

References

External links

 Otto Pfister Interview
 Otto Pfister: The Grand Old Man of African Football

1937 births
Living people
Footballers from Cologne
German footballers
German football managers
West German football managers
German expatriate football managers
FC Viktoria Köln players
FC St. Gallen players
FC Grenchen players
FC Nordstern Basel players
FC Vaduz players
West German expatriate sportspeople in Liechtenstein
German expatriate footballers
Expatriate footballers in Liechtenstein
FC Chur 97 players
FC Chiasso players
2006 FIFA World Cup managers
Expatriate football managers in Liechtenstein
FC Vaduz managers
Expatriate football managers in Switzerland
FC St. Gallen managers
Expatriate football managers in Rwanda
Rwanda national football team managers
Expatriate football managers in Burkina Faso
Burkina Faso national football team managers
Expatriate football managers in Senegal
Senegal national football team managers
Expatriate football managers in Ivory Coast
Ivory Coast national football team managers
Expatriate football managers in the Democratic Republic of the Congo
Democratic Republic of the Congo national football team managers
Expatriate football managers in Ghana
Ghana national football team managers
Expatriate football managers in Bangladesh
Bangladesh national football team managers
Expatriate football managers in Saudi Arabia
Saudi Arabia national football team managers
Expatriate football managers in Togo
Togo national football team managers
Expatriate football managers in Cameroon
Cameroon national football team managers
Expatriate football managers in Trinidad and Tobago
Trinidad and Tobago national football team managers
Expatriate football managers in Egypt
Zamalek SC managers
CS Sfaxien managers
USM Alger managers
Expatriate football managers in Algeria
German expatriate sportspeople in Algeria
Al-Merrikh SC managers
1978 African Cup of Nations managers
1988 African Cup of Nations managers
1992 African Cup of Nations managers
2008 Africa Cup of Nations managers
Association football forwards
1997 FIFA Confederations Cup managers
Expatriate football managers in Lebanon
Lebanese Premier League managers
Nejmeh SC managers
Al Masry SC managers
Afghanistan national football team managers
West German expatriate sportspeople in Senegal
German expatriate sportspeople in Afghanistan
German expatriate sportspeople in Togo
German expatriate sportspeople in Tunisia
German expatriate sportspeople in Egypt
German expatriate sportspeople in Saudi Arabia
German expatriate sportspeople in Ghana
German expatriate sportspeople in Lebanon
German expatriate sportspeople in Bangladesh
West German expatriate sportspeople in Ivory Coast
German expatriate sportspeople in Trinidad and Tobago
West German expatriate sportspeople in the Democratic Republic of the Congo
West German expatriate sportspeople in Rwanda
West German expatriate sportspeople in Burkina Faso
West German footballers
West German expatriate footballers
West German expatriate sportspeople in Switzerland
West German expatriate sportspeople in Portugal